Inconel is a registered trademark of Special Metals Corporation for a family of austenitic nickel-chromium-based superalloys.

Inconel alloys are oxidation-corrosion-resistant materials well suited for service in extreme environments subjected to pressure and heat. When heated, Inconel forms a thick, stable, passivating oxide layer protecting the surface from further attack. Inconel retains strength over a wide temperature range, attractive for high-temperature applications where aluminium and steel would succumb to creep as a result of thermally-induced crystal vacancies.  Inconel's high-temperature strength is developed by solid solution strengthening or precipitation hardening, depending on the alloy.

Inconel alloys are typically used in high temperature applications. Common trade names for

 Inconel Alloy 625 include: Inconel 625, Chronin 625, Altemp 625, Haynes 625, Nickelvac 625 Nicrofer 6020 and UNS designation N06625. 

 Inconel Alloy 600 include: NA14, BS3076, 2.4816, NiCr15Fe (FR), NiCr15Fe (EU), NiCr15Fe8 (DE) and UNS designation N06600. 

 Inconel 718 include: Nicrofer 5219, Superimphy 718, Haynes 718, Pyromet 718, Supermet 718, Udimet 718 and UNS designation N07718.

History 
The Inconel family of alloys was first developed before December 1932, when its trademark was registered by the International Nickel Company of Delaware and New York. A significant early use was found in support of the development of the Whittle jet engine, during the 1940s by research teams at Henry Wiggin & Co of Hereford, England a subsidiary of the Mond Nickel Company, which merged with Inco in 1928. The Hereford Works and its properties including the Inconel trademark were acquired in 1998 by Special Metals Corporation.

Specific data

Composition
Inconel alloys vary widely in their compositions, but all are predominantly nickel, with chromium as the second element.

Properties
Inconel alloys are oxidation- and corrosion-resistant materials well suited for service in extreme environments subjected to high mechanical loads. When heated, Inconel forms a thick and stable passivating oxide layer protecting the surface from further attack. Inconel retains strength over a wide temperature range, attractive for high-temperature applications where aluminium and steel would succumb to creep as a result of thermally induced crystal vacancies (see Arrhenius equation). Inconel's high temperature strength is developed by solid solution strengthening or precipitation strengthening, depending on the alloy. In age-hardening or precipitation-strengthening varieties, small amounts of niobium combine with nickel to form the intermetallic compound Ni3Nb or gamma double prime (γ″). Gamma prime forms small cubic crystals that inhibit slip and creep effectively at elevated temperatures.

Machining
Inconel is a difficult metal to shape and to machine using traditional cold forming techniques due to rapid work hardening. After the first machining pass, work hardening tends to plastically deform either the workpiece or the tool on subsequent passes. For this reason, age-hardened Inconels such as 718 are typically machined using an aggressive but slow cut with a hard tool, minimizing the number of passes required. Alternatively, the majority of the machining can be performed with the workpiece in a "solutionized" form, with only the final steps being performed after age hardening. However some claim that Inconel can be machined extremely quickly with very fast spindle speeds using a multifluted ceramic tool with small depth of cut at high feed rates as this causes localised heating and softening in front of the flute.

External threads are machined using a lathe to "single-point" the threads or by rolling the threads in the solution treated condition (for hardenable alloys) using a screw machine. Inconel 718 can also be roll-threaded after full aging by using induction heat to   without increasing the grain size. Holes with internal threads are made by threadmilling. Internal threads can also be formed using a sinker electrical discharge machining (EDM).

More often than machining, water-jet or laser grinding is a preferred and economical method for forming nickel alloy components to shape and finish. Due to the hardness of the abrasives used, the grinding wheels are not as affected by the material work hardening and remain sharp and durable.

Joining
Welding of some Inconel alloys (especially the gamma prime precipitation hardened family; e.g., Waspaloy and X-750) can be difficult due to cracking and microstructural segregation of alloying elements in the heat-affected zone. However, several alloys such as 625 and 718 have been designed to overcome these problems. The most common welding methods are gas tungsten arc welding and electron-beam welding.

Uses

Inconel is often encountered in extreme environments. It is common in gas turbine blades, seals, and combustors, as well as turbocharger rotors and seals, electric submersible well pump motor shafts, high temperature fasteners, chemical processing and pressure vessels, heat exchanger tubing, steam generators and core components in nuclear pressurized water reactors, natural gas processing with contaminants such as H2S and CO2, firearm sound suppressor blast baffles, and Formula One, NASCAR, NHRA, and APR, LLC exhaust systems. Inconel is increasingly used in the boilers of waste incinerators. The Joint European Torus and DIII-D tokamaks' vacuum vessels are made of Inconel. Inconel 718 is commonly used for cryogenic storage tanks, downhole shafts, wellhead parts, and in the aerospace industry -- where  it has become a prime candidate material for constructing heat resistant turbines.

Aerospace
The Space Shuttle used four Inconel studs to secure the solid rocket boosters to the launch platform, eight total studs supported the entire weight of the ready to fly Shuttle system. Eight frangible nuts are encased on the outside of the solid rocket boosters, at launch explosives separated the nuts releasing the Shuttle from its launch platform.
North American Aviation constructed the skin of the North American X-15 Rocket-powered aircraft out of Inconel X/750 alloy.
Rocketdyne used Inconel X-750 for the thrust chamber of the F-1 rocket engine used in the first stage of the Saturn V booster.
SpaceX uses inconel (Inconel 718) in the engine manifold of their Merlin engine which powers the Falcon 9 launch vehicle.
In a first for 3D printing, the SpaceX SuperDraco rocket engine that provides launch escape system for the Dragon V2 crew-carrying space capsule is fully printed.
 SpaceX cast the Raptor rocket engine manifolds from SX300, later SX500, which are monocrystal nickel alloy (improvement over older Inconel alloys).

Automotive
Tesla is now claiming to use Inconel in place of steel in the main battery pack contactor of its Model S so that it remains springy under the heat of heavy current. Tesla claims that this allows these upgraded vehicles to safely increase the maximum pack output from 1300 to 1500 amperes, allowing for an increase in power output (acceleration) Tesla refers to as "Ludicrous Mode".
Ford Motor Company is using Inconel to make the turbine wheel in the turbocharger of its EcoBlue diesel engines introduced in 2016.
The exhaust valves on NHRA Top Fuel and Funny Car drag racing engines are often made of Inconel. Inconel is also used in the manufacture of exhaust valves in high performance aftermarket turbo and Supercharged Mazda Miata engine builds (see Flyin' Miata).
Ford Australia used Inconel valves in their turbocharged Barra engines. These valves have been proven very reliable, holding in excess of 1900 horsepower.
BMW has since used Inconel in the exhaust manifold of its high performance luxury car, the BMW M5 E34 with the S38 engine, withstanding higher temperatures and reducing backpressure.
Jaguar Cars has fit, in their Jaguar F-Type SVR high performance sports car, a new lightweight Inconel titanium exhaust system as standard which withstands higher peak temperatures, reduces backpressure and eliminates  of mass from the vehicle.
DeLorean Motor Company offers Inconel replacements for failure prone OE trailing arm bolts on the DMC-12. Failure of these bolts can result in loss of the vehicle.

Rolled Inconel was frequently used as the recording medium by engraving in black box recorders on aircraft.

Alternatives to the use of Inconel in chemical applications such as scrubbers, columns, reactors, and pipes are Hastelloy, perfluoroalkoxy (PFA) lined carbon steel or fiber reinforced plastic.

Inconel alloys
Alloys of inconel include:
 Inconel 188: Readily fabricated for commercial gas turbine and aerospace applications. 
 Inconel 230: Alloy 230 Plate & Sheet mainly used by the power, aerospace, chemical processing and industrial heating industries.
 Inconel 600: Solid solution strengthened
 Inconel 601:
 Inconel 617: Solid solution strengthened (nickel-chromium-cobalt-molybdenum), high-temperature strength, corrosion and oxidation resistant, high workability and weldability. Incorporated in ASME Boiler and Pressure Vessel Code for high temperature nuclear applications such as molten salt reactors  April, 2020.
 Inconel 625: Acid resistant, good weldability. The LCF version is typically used in bellows.
 Inconel 690: Low cobalt content for nuclear applications, and low resistivity
 Inconel 713C: Precipitation hardenable nickel-chromium base cast alloy
 Inconel 718: Gamma double prime strengthened with good weldability
 Inconel X-750: Commonly used for gas turbine components, including blades, seals and rotors. 
 Inconel 751: Increased aluminium content for improved rupture strength in the 1600 °F range
 Inconel 792: Increased aluminium content for improved high temperature corrosion resistant properties, used especially in gas turbines
 Inconel 907
 Inconel 909
 Inconel 706
 Inconel 939: Gamma prime strengthened to increase weldability.
 Inconel 925: Inconel 925 is a nonstabilized austenitic stainless steel with low carbon content.

In age hardening or precipitation strengthening varieties, alloying additions of aluminum and titanium combine with nickel to form the intermetallic compound  or gamma prime (γ′). Gamma prime forms small cubic crystals that inhibit slip and creep effectively at elevated temperatures.

See also

 Hastelloy
 Incoloy
 Monel
 Nimonic
 Stellite

References

Metals
Nickel–chromium alloys
Refractory metals
Superalloys
Aerospace materials
Nickel alloys
Chromium alloys